An arrondissement is a level of administrative division in Haiti.

, the 10 departments of Haiti were divided into 42 arrondissements.

Arrondissements are further divided into communes and communal sections.

The term arrondissement can be roughly translated into English as district. A more etymologically precise, but less allegorical, definition would be encirclements, from the French arrondir, to encircle. Because no single translation adequately conveys the layered sense of the word, the French term is usually used in English writing.

The Arrondissements are listed below, by department:

List

References

External links
Code Postal Haitien
Haiti-Référence 7320. - Arrondissements et communes d’Haiti

See also
Haiti
Departments of Haiti
Communes of Haiti

 
Subdivisions of Haiti
Haiti, Arrondissements
Haiti 2
Districts, Haiti
Haiti geography-related lists